Chen Kuan-lien is a Taiwanese beauty pageant titleholder who was crowned as Miss Earth Chinese Taipei 2014 that gives her the right to represent Chinese Taipei at Miss Earth 2014.

Pageantry

Miss Republic of China 2014
Chen joined Miss Republic of China 2014. She won the pageant and succeeded Lyu Ying Li.

Miss Earth 2014
By winning Miss Earth Chinese Taipei, Chen flew to the Philippines in November 29, 2014 for Miss Earth.

References

External links
Miss Earth Official Website

Living people
Year of birth missing (living people)
People from Kaohsiung
Miss Earth 2014 contestants
Taiwanese beauty pageant winners